The 202nd Independent Infantry Brigade (Home) was a short-lived Home Defence formation of the British Army during the Second World War.

Origin and Service
The 202nd Independent Infantry Brigade (Home) was formed for service in the United Kingdom on 20 October 1940 by No 2 Infantry Training Group in the Northumbrian Area (later Northumberland County Division) of Home Forces. It was commanded by Brigadier H. Pawle (Brigadier G.F. Gough from 20 May 1941), and comprised four newly raised infantry battalions from Northern England. Home brigades had a purely static coast defence role.

The brigade's units had been dispersed to other brigades (in the Northumberland County Division and outside it) or for conversion to other roles by the time the brigade ceased to function operationally on 1 December. The Brigade HQ was disbanded on 22 December 1941.

Order of battle
The composition of 202nd Brigade was as follows:
 11th Battalion, King's Regiment (Liverpool) – formed 4 July 1940 at Formby; joined 20 October 1940, left 18 November 1941; converted into 152nd Regiment, Royal Armoured Corps 1 January 1942
 12th Battalion, King's Regiment (Liverpool) – formed 4 July 1940; joined 20 October 1940; to 225th Independent Infantry Brigade (Home) 27 May 1941; converted later that year into 101st Light Anti-Aircraft Regiment, Royal Artillery
 11th Battalion, Green Howards – formed 4 July 1940 at Richmond, North Yorkshire; joined 20 October 1940, left 26 November 1941; later to 143rd Infantry Brigade
 7th Battalion, East Lancashire Regiment – formed as 50th Holding Battalion, East Lancashires May 1940; became 7th Bn  July 1940; joined 20 October 1940, left 26 November 1941; converted into 103rd Light Anti-Aircraft Regiment, Royal Artillery 1 December 1941
 9th (Garrison) Battalion, Green Howards – formed 23 March 1940 at Dover; served in the Shetlands garrison as part of Orkney and Shetland Defence Force (OSDEF); transferred from 216th Independent Infantry Brigade (Home) 14 November 1941; left 30 November and converted into 108th Light Anti-Aircraft Regiment, Royal Artillery 1 January 1942<ref name = Frederick108/

Notes

References
 Basil Collier, History of the Second World War, United Kingdom Military Series: The Defence of the United Kingdom, London: HM Stationery Office, 1957/Uckfield: Naval & Military, 2004, .
 J.B.M. Frederick, Lineage Book of British Land Forces 1660–1978, Vol I, Wakefield: Microform Academic, 1984, .
 J.B.M. Frederick, Lineage Book of British Land Forces 1660–1978, Vol II, Wakefield: Microform Academic, 1984, .
 

Military units and formations established in 1940
Infantry brigades of the British Army
Infantry brigades of the British Army in World War II
Military units and formations disestablished in 1941